This is a list of patrol vessels of the United States Navy.

Ship status is indicated as either currently active [A] (including ready reserve), inactive [I], or precommissioning [P]. Ships in the inactive category include only ships in the inactive reserve, ships which have been disposed from US service have no listed status. Ships in the precommissioning category include ships under construction or on order.

Patrol craft coastal (PC)

The original PC hull number sequence ended in 1964, and was then restarted with '1' for this class.

Cyclone-class

 
 
  [A]
  [A]
 
  [A]
 
 
  [A]
 
 
  [A]

Hovercraft

Patrol air cushion vehicle (PACV)

The Navy used 3 Patrol Air Cushion Vehicle hovercraft in Vietnam.

Hydrofoil vessels

Patrol craft hydrofoil (PCH)
  (Boeing)

Patrol gunboat hydrofoil (PGH)
  (Grumman experimental class)
  (Boeing, JetFoil predecessor)

Patrol missile hydrofoil (PHM)

 , ex-Delphinus

Patrol boat, river (PBR)

The Patrol Boat, River was acquired for the Vietnam War: 718 of these 31/32-foot long boats were purchased with a peak of 250 used in Vietnam.

Patrol craft (PC)

 , ex-SP-104, later PYc-46
 , later PYc-47
 , later PYc-48
 , sunk in collision 14 August 1941
 , later PYc-49
 , later PY-18
 , later PYc-50
 , later PYc-51
 , later YP-105
 , later YP-77

The following submarine chasers were 173/174 feet long and used the PC designation. The large missing sections of these numbers for the most part come from the sharing of the same number sequence with the 110-foot submarine chasers that used the SC designation and the 134-foot patrol craft sweepers that used the PCS designation. This number sequence would end in 1964, and then restart with '1' for the Cyclone-class costal patrol craft.

  (experimental ship)
  (experimental ship), later IX-211

s

 
 
 
 
 USS Paragould (PC-465)
 
 USS PC-467 to Norway as 
 
 
 USS Antigo (PC-470)
 
 
 
 
 
 
 
 
 
 
 
 
 
 
 
 
 
 , later IX-221
 
 
 
 
 
 
 
 , sunk by torpedo 4 June 1943, 5 killed

497-507, 511 to 522, and 524-539 were used by SC submarine chasers

 
 
 
 
 
 
 
 
 
 , later PCC-549
 
 
 
 
 
 , later PCC-555
 
 
 , sunk by torpedo 9 May 1944, approx. 35 killed
 
 
 
 
 , later PCC-563
 
 USS Gilmer (PC-565)
 
 
 USS Altus (PC-568)
 
 
 
 
 
 
 
 
 
 , later PCC-578
 
 
 
 , later PCC-582
 
 
 
 USS Patchogue (PC-586)
 
 , later PCC-588
 , later PCC-589
 
 
 
 
 
 
 
 
 , later PCC-598
 
 
 
 
 
 
 
 
 
 
 
 
 
 
 
 
 
 
 
 
 
 
 
 
 
 , later YW-120
 
 
 
 
 
 
 
 
 
 
 
 
 
 
 
 
 
 
 
 
 
 
 
 
 
 
 
  to Republic of Korea as Kum Gang San (PC-702)
 
 
 , later PCC-802, to Republic of Korea as Sam Gak San (PC-703)
 , later PCC-803
 
 , later PGM-10
 , later PGM-11
 
 
 
  to Republic of Korea as Jiri San (PC-704)
 
 , sunk in collision 11 September 1945, 1 killed
 
 USS Welch (PC-817)
 
 
 
 
 
  to Republic of Korea as Pak Tu San (PC-701)
 
 
 USS PC-826, later PYc-52
 , later SC-1039
 
 
 
 
 
 
 
 
 
 
 
 , later PGM-12
 , later PGM-13
 , later PGM-14
 , later PGM-15
 USS Greencastle (PC-1119)
 
 
 
 
 
 
 , later PCC-1126
 
 
 
 
 
 
 
 
 
 USS Galena (PC-1136), later PCC-1136
 USS Worthington (PC-1137), later PCC-1137
 USS Lapeer (PC-1138)
 USS Glenwood (PC-1140)
 USS Pierre (PC-1141)
 USS Hanford (PC-1142)
 
 
 
 
 
 , later PGM-16
 
 
 
 , later PCC-1169
 
 
 
 
 
 
 
 , later PCC-1177
 , later PCC-1178
 USS Morris (PC-1179)
 
 USS Wildwood (PC-1181)
 
 
 
 
 
 
 
 USS PC-1189, later PGM-17
 
 
 
 
 
 
 
 
 
 
 
 
 
 
 
 
 
 
 
 
 
 
 
 
 
 
 
 
 
 
 
 
 
 
 
 
 
 
 
 
 
 
 USS Abingdon (PC-1237)
 
 
 
 
 
 , later PCC-1244
 
 
 
  to France as Sabre (W11)
  to France as Pique (W13)
  to France as Cimeterre (W12)
 , later PCC-1251
 
 
 
 USS PC-1255, later PGM-18
 
 
 
 , sunk by shore gunfire 6 June 1944
 
 
 , one of 2 USN ships with a nearly all African-American crew in WW2
 

1376 to 1465 used by PCS patrol minesweepers, a few did hold the PC designation at times
 , later PCS-1427
 USS PC-1465, later PCS-1465

The Adroit-class was a group of PC-461-class submarine chasers completed as minesweepers (AM-82 through AM-99). However, they were considered unsatisfactory in this role, and were all eventually converted back into submarine chasers.

 
 
 , later PGM-9
 
 , later PGM-19
 , later PGM-20
 , later PGM-21
 , later PGM-22
 , later PGM-23
 , later PGM-24
 , later PGM-25
 , later PGM-26
 , later PGM-27
 , later PGM-28
  to France as Coutelas (W22)
 
  to France as Javelot (W23)
 
 
 PC-1565, later PGM-29
 PC-1566, later PGM-30
 PC-1567, later PGM-31
 PC-1568, later PGM-32
 
 PC-1570 to PC-1585 canceled
 , ex-AM-82
 , ex-AM-83
 , ex-AM-84
 , ex-AM-85
 , ex-AM-86
 , ex-AM-87
 , ex-AM-88
 , ex-AM-89
 , ex-AM-90
 , ex-AM-91
 , ex-AM-92
 , ex-AM-93
 , ex-AM-94
 , ex-AM-95, later PCC-1599
 , ex-AM-96
 , ex-AM-97, later PCC-1601
 , ex-AM-98, later PCC-1602
 , ex-AM-99
  to France as Le Fougueux (P641)
  to France as L'Opiniatre (P642)
  to France as L'Agile (P643)
  to Portugal as Maio (P587)
  to Portugal as Porto Santo (P 588)
  to Yugoslavia as Udarnik (PBR 51)
  to Ethiopia as Zerai Deres, then to Italy as Vedetta F597
  to Portugal as Sao Nicolus (P 589)
  to France as P-7
  to Italy as Albatros (F 543)
  to Italy as Alcione (F 544)
  to Italy as Airone (F 545)
  to Denmark as Bellona (F 344)
  to Denmark as Diana (F 345)
  to Denmark as Flora (F 346)
  to Denmark as Triton (F 347)
  to Italy as Aquila (F 542)
  to Portugal as Brava (P 590)
  to Portugal as Fogo (P 591)
  to Portugal as Boavista (P 592)
  to Turkey as Sultanhisar (P 111)
  to Turkey as Demirhisar (P 112)
  to Turkey as Yarhisar (P 113)
  to Turkey as Akhisar (P 114)
  to Turkey as Sivrihisar (P 115)
  to Turkey as Kochisar (P 116)
  built in Denmark as Peder Skram (F 352)
  built in Denmark as Herluf Trolle (F 353)
  built in Chile as Papudo (P 37)
  canceled

Patrol craft, control (PCC)

Thirty-five submarine chasers (PC) were converted into amphibious landing control vessels during World War II and reclassified as Patrol Craft, Control after the war.

Patrol craft escort, and patrol craft escort rescue (PCE, PCER)

PCE-827 to PCE-841

  to UK as HMS Kilbernie (BEC 1)
  to UK as HMS Kilbride (BEC 2)
  to UK as HMS Kilchatten (BEC 3)
  to UK as HMS Kilchrenan (BEC 4)
  to UK as HMS Kildary (BEC 5)
  to UK as HMS Kildwick (BEC 6)
  to UK as HMS Kilham (BEC 7)
  to UK as HMS Kilkenzie (BEC 8)
  to UK as HMS Kilhampton (BEC 9)
  to UK as HMS Kilmacolm (BEC 10)
  to UK as HMS Kilmarnok (BEC 11)
  to UK as HMS Kilmartin (BEC 12)
  to UK as HMS Kilmelford (BEC 13)
  to UK as HMS Kilmington (BEC 14)
  to UK as HMS Kilmore (BEC 15)

PCE-842 to PCE-904

 
 
 
 
 
 
 
 
 
 
 
 
 
 
 
 
 
 
 
 PCE-861 to PCE-866 canceled
 
 
 
 
 
 
 
 
 
 , later YDG-8
  USS PCE(C)-877, later PCE-877
 , later ACM-4
 , later YDG-9
 
 
 
 , later YDG-10
 
 
 
 PCE-887 to PCE-890 canceled
 
 
 
 
 
 
 
 
 
 
 USS PCE-901, later AG-72

PCE-905 to PCE-960

 USS PCE-905, later AM-232
 USS PCE-906, later AM-233
 USS PCE-907, later AM-363
 USS PCE-908, later AM-235
 USS PCE-909, later AM-236
 PCE-910 cancelled June 6, 1944
 USS PCE-911, later AM-351
 USS PCE-912, later AM-352
 USS PCE-913, later AM-353
 USS PCE-914, later AM-354
 USS PCE-915, later AM-355
 USS PCE-916, later AM-356
 USS PCE-917, later AM-357
 USS PCE-918, later AM-358
 USS PCE-919, later AM-359
 PCE-920 to PCE-934 canceled November 1, 1945
 PCE(R)-935 to PCE(R)-946 canceled
 PCE-947 to PCE-960 canceled

PCE-1604 to PCE-1609
  to Netherlands as Fret (F 818)
  to Netherlands as Hermelijn (F 819)
  to Netherlands as Vos (F 820)
  to Netherlands as Wolf (F 817)
  to Netherlands as Panter (F 821)
  to Netherlands as Jaguar (F 822)

Patrol craft fast (PCF)

The Patrol Craft Fast, also known as the Swift Boats, were acquired for the Vietnam War; 193 of these 50 foot boats were purchased.

Patrol craft sweeper (PCS)
At least 90 134-foot  hulls were completed as patrol craft. These were judged to not be successful, and many were converted to sonar school ships or back to minesweepers.

 
 , sonar school ship
 , sonar school ship
 , later PCSC-1379
 
 
 
 , sonar school ship
 , sonar school ship
 , sonar school ship
 , sonar school ship
 , sonar school ship
 , later AGS-7
 , later PCSC-1389
 , later PCSC-1390
 , later PCSC-1391
 , sonar school ship
 , later YMS-446
 , later YMS-447
 , later YMS-448
 , later AGS-8
 , sonar school ship
 , later YMS-449
 , sonar school ship, later YMS-450
 , ex-AMS-59, sonar school ship
 , ex-YMS-452, sonar school ship
 , later PCSC-1402
 , later PCSC-1403
 , later AGS-9
 
 , later YMS-453
 , later YMS-454
 , later YMS-455
 , later YMS-456
 , later YMS-457
 , later YMS-458
 , later YMS-459
 
 
 , later YMS-460
 , later YMS-461
 , sonar school ship
 , later PCSC-1418
 
 , sonar school ship
 , later PCSC-1421
 
 , sonar school ship
 , sonar school ship
 
 , sonar school ship
 , ex-PC-1427, later YMS-462
 , later YMS-463
 , later PCSC-1429
 
 
 , later YMS-464
 , later YMS-465
 , later YMS-466
 , later YMS-467
 , later YMS-468
 , later YMS-469
 , later YMS-470
 , later YMS-471
 , later YMS-472
 , sonar school ship
 , sonar school ship
 , later YMS-473
 , ex-YMS-474, sonar school ship
 , sonar school ship
 , sonar school ship
 , later YMS-475
 , sonar school ship, later YMS-476
 , sonar school ship
 
 
 , later PCSC-1452
 , later YMS-477
 , later YMS-478
 , later PCSC-1455
 , later YMS-479
 , later AGS-10
 , later AGS-6
 
 , later PCSC-1460
 , later PCSC-1461
 , later YMS-480
 , later YMS-481
 , later AMc-203
 , ex-PC-1465, later AMc-204

Patrol craft sweeper, control (PCSC)

Thirteen patrol craft sweepers (PCS) were converted into amphibious landing control vessels during World War II and reclassified as Patrol Craft Sweeper, Control.

Patrol escort (PE)
Of 112 Eagle class patrol craft planned 60 of these World War I era ships were completed, being given numbers from 1 to 60.  Only three were commissioned prior to the Armistice which ended World War I and only eight saw service in World War II of which PE-56 was sunk by a U-boat.

PE-61 through PE-112 were cancelled on November 30, 1918.
PE-5, PE-15, PE-25, PE-45, PE-65, PE-75, PE-86, PE-95, PE-105, and PE-112 were allotted for transfer to Italy, though this plan was cancelled and none were ever delivered.

Patrol frigate (PF)

  ex-PG-101
  ex-PG-102

Tacoma-class frigates

  ex-PG-111
  ex-PG-112
  ex-PG-113
  ex-PG-114
  ex-PG-115
  ex-PG-116
  ex-PG-117
  ex-PG-118
  ex-PG-119
  ex-PG-120
  ex-PG-121
  ex-PG-122
  ex-PG-123
  ex-PG-124
  ex-PG-125
  ex-PG-126
  ex-PG-127
  ex-PG-128
  ex-PG-129
  ex-PG-130
  ex-PG-131
  ex-PG-132
  ex-PG-133
  ex-PG-134
  ex-PG-135
  ex-PG-136
  ex-PG-137
  ex-PG-138
  ex-PG-139
  ex-PG-140
  ex-, ex-PG-141
  ex-PG-142
  ex-PG-143
  ex-PG-144
  ex-PG-145
  ex-PG-146
  ex-PG-147
  ex-PG-148
  ex-PG-149
  ex-PG-150
  ex-PG-151
  ex-PG-152
  ex-PG-153
  ex-PG-154
  ex-PG-155
  ex-PG-156
  ex-PG-157
  ex-PG-158
  ex-PG-159
  ex-PG-160
  ex-PG-161
  ex-PG-162
  ex-PG-163
  ex-PG-164
  ex-PG-165
  ex-, ex-PG-166
  ex-PG-167
  ex-PG-168
  ex-PG-169
  ex-, ex-PG-170
  ex-, ex-PG-171
  ex-PG-172
  ex-PG-173
  ex-PG-174
  ex-PG-175
  ex-PG-176
  ex-PG-177
  ex-PG-178
  ex-PG-179
  ex-, ex-PG-180 to U.K. as 
  ex-PG-181 to UK as 
  ex-PG-182 to UK as 
  ex-PG-183 to UK as 
  ex-PG-184 to UK as 
  ex-PG-185 to UK as 
  ex-PG-186 to UK as 
  ex-PG-187 to UK as 
  ex-PG-188 to UK as 
  ex-PG-189 to UK as 
  ex-PG-190 to UK as 
  ex-PG-191 to UK as 
  ex-PG-192 to UK as 
  ex-PG-193 to UK as 
  ex- to UK as 
  ex-PG-195 to UK as 
  ex-PG-196 to UK as 
  ex-PG-197 to UK as 
  ex-PG-198 to UK as 
  ex-Peyton to UK as 
  ex-Prowse to UK as 
  ex-
  ex-, ex-PG-202
  ex-PG-203, Construction cancelled December 31, 1943
  ex-PG-204 Construction cancelled December 31, 1943
  ex- Contract cancelled January 11, 1944
  ex-PG-206 Construction cancelled December 31, 1943
  ex-PG-207
  ex-PG-208
  ex-PG-209
  ex-PG-210

  to Iran as Bayandor (F 25)
  to Iran as Naghdi (F 26)
  to Iran as Milanian (F 27)
  to Iran as Kahnamuie (F 28)
  to Thailand as Tapi (PF 5)
  to Thailand as Khirirat (PF 6)

Patrol gunboat (PG)

 
 
 
 
 
 
 
 , later IX-30
 
 , later IX-1
 
 , later IX-19
 
 , later IX-28
 
 , later PR-1
 , ex-AG-6, IX-9
 , ex-AG-7, IX-23
 
 , later PR-2
 
 , later Tacloban
 , ex-Rockport, later IX-18
 
  ex-C-11
 , ex-C-14/CL-16
 , ex-C-15/CL-17
 , ex-C-16/CL-18
 , ex-C-17/CL-19
 , ex-C-18/CL-20
 , ex-C-19/CL-21
 , later CL-22
 , later IX-35
 , later CL-23
 
 
 
 
 
 , later PR-3
 , later PR-4
 , later PR-5
 , later PR-6
 , later PR-7
 , later PR-8
 , ex-AS-1
 
 
 , ex-CMc-2, later AGP-1
 
 
 , later AGP-3
 , later AGC-369
 , sunk by torpedo 5 August 1943
 , later AGP-2
 
 
 
  ex-
  ex-
  ex-
  ex-, renamed  on return
  ex-
  ex-
  ex-
  ex-
  ex-
  ex-
 
  ex-SP-159, later AGS-3
  ex-
  ex-
  ex-
  ex-
  to UK as 
  to UK as 
  ex 
  formerly 
  ex-
  ex-
  ex-
  to UK as 
  to UK as 
  to UK as 
  to UK as 
 , later PF-1
 , later PF-2
 PG-103 to UK as 
 PG-104 to UK as 
  to UK as 
 PG-106 to UK as 
 PG-107 to UK as 
  to UK as 
 PG-109 to UK as 
  to UK as 

Tacoma-class frigates

 , later PF-3
 , later PF-4
 , later PF-5
 , later PF-6
 , later PF-7
 , later PF-8
 , later PF-9
 , later PF-10
 , later PF-11
 , later PF-12
 , later PF-13
 , later PF-14
 , later PF-15
 , later PF-16
 , later PF-17
 , later PF-18
 , later PF-19
 , later PF-20
 , later PF-21
 , later PF-22
 , later PF-23
 , later PF-24
 , later PF-25
 , later PF-26
 , later PF-27
 , later PF-28
 , later PF-29
 , later PF-30
 , later PF-31
 , later PF-32
 , later PF-33
 , later PF-34
 , later PF-35
 , later PF-36
 , later PF-37
 , later PF-38
 , later PF-39
 , later PF-40
 , later PF-41
 , later PF-42
 , later PF-43
 , later 
 , later PF-45
 , later PF-46
 , later PF-47
 , later PF-48
 , later PF-49
 , later PF-50
 , later PF-51
 , later PF-52
 , later PF-53
 , later PF-54
 , later PF-55
 , later PF-56
 , later PF-57
 , later PF-58
 , later PF-59
 , later PF-60
 , later PF-61
 , later PF-62
 , later PF-63
 , later PF-64
 , later PF-65
 , later PF-66
 , later PF-67
 , later PF-68
 , later PF-69
 , later PF-70
 , later PF-71
 , later PF-72; to UK as 
 , later PF-73; to UK as 
 , later PF-74; to UK as 
 , later PF-75; to UK as 
 , later PF-76; to UK as 
 , later PF-77; to UK as 
 , later PF-78; to UK as 
 , later PF-79; to UK as 
 , later PF-82; to UK as 
 , later PF-83; to UK as 
 , later PF-84; to UK as 
 , later PF-85; to UK as 
 , later PF-86; to UK as 
 , later PF-87; to UK as 
 , later PF-88; to UK as 
 , later PF-90; to UK as 
 , later PF-91; to UK as 
 , later PF-92; to UK as 
 , later PF-93
 , later PF-94
 , later PF-95; cancelled 31 December 1943
 , later PF-96; cancelled 31 December 1943
 , later PF-97; cancelled 11 January 1944 
 , later PF-98; cancelled 31 December 1943
 , later PF-99
 , later PF-100
 , later PF-101
 , later PF-102

Patrol motor gunboat (PGM)

  ex-SC-644
  ex-SC-757
  ex-SC-1035
  ex-SC-1053
  ex-SC-1056
  ex-SC-1071
  ex-SC-1072
  ex-SC-1366
  ex-PC-1548, wrecked by Typhoon Louise Okinawa October 1945, no fatalities
  ex-PC-805
  ex-PC-806
  ex-PC-1088
  ex-PC-1089
  ex-PC-1090
  ex-PC-1091
  ex-PC-1148
  ex-PC-1189
  ex-PC-1255, sunk by mine 7 April 1945, 13 killed or missing
  ex-PC-1550
  ex-PC-1551
  ex-PC-1552
  ex-PC-1553
  ex-PC-1554
  ex-PC-1555
  ex-PC-1556
  ex-PC-1557
  ex-PC-1558
  ex-PC-1559
  ex-PC-1565
  ex-PC-1566
  ex-PC-1567
  ex-PC-1568
  to the Philippines as Camarines (PG 48)
  to the Philippines as Sulu (PG 49)
  to the Philippines as La Union (PG 50)
  to the Philippines as Antique (PG 51)
  to the Philippines as Masbate (PG 52)
  to the Philippines as Mismamis Occidental (PG 53)
  to the Philippines as Agusan (G 61)
  to the Philippines as Catanduanes (G 62)
  to the Philippines as Romblon (G 63)
  to the Philippines as Palawan (G 64)
  to Burma as PGM-401
  to Burma as PGM-402
  to Burma as PGM-403
  to Burma as PGM-404
  to Denmark as Daphne (P 530)
  to Denmark as Havmanden (P 532)
  to Denmark as Najaden (P 534)
  to Denmark as Neptun (P 536)
  to Burma as PGM-405
  to Burma as PGM-406
  to Ethiopia as PC-13
  to Ethiopia as PC-14
  to Indonesia as Bentang Silungkang (P 572)
  to Indonesia as Bentang Waitatiri (P 571)
  to Indonesia as Bentang Kalukuang (P 570)
  to Ethiopia as PC-15
  to South Vietnam as Kim Qui (HQ 605)
  to South Vietnam as May Rut (HQ 606)
  to South Vietnam as Nam Du (HQ 607)
  to South Vietnam as Hoa Lu (HQ 608)
  to South Vietnam as To Yen (HQ 609)
  to South Vietnam as Phu Du (HQ 600)
  to South Vietnam as Tien Moi (HQ 601)
  to South Vietnam as Minh Hoa (HQ 602)
  to South Vietnam as Kien Vang (HQ 603)
  to South Vietnam as Keo Ngua (HQ 604)
  to South Vietnam as Dienh Hai (HQ 610)
  to South Vietnam as Truong Sa (HQ 611)
  to Thailand as T-11
  to South Vietnam as Thai Binh (HQ 612)
  to South Vietnam as Thi Tu (HQ 613)
  to South Vietnam as Song Tu (HQ 614)
  to Ecuador as Quito (LC 71)
  to Ecuador as Guayaquil (LC 72)
  to the Dominican Republic as Betelgeuse (GC 102)
  to Peru as Rio Sama (PC 11)
  to Thailand as T-12
  to South Vietnam as Tat Sa (HQ 615)
  to South Vietnam as Phu Quoi (HQ 617)
  to South Vietnam as Hoang Sa (HQ 616)
 PGM-83 to South Vietnam as Hon Troc (HQ 618) Escaped to the Philippines in 1976
 
 
 
 
 
 
 
  to South Vietnam as Tho Chau (HQ 619)
 
 
 
 
 
 
 
 
 
 
  to Liberia as Alert
  to Iran as Parvan (PGM 211)
  to Turkey as AB-21
  to Turkey as AB-22
  to Turkey as AB-23
  to Thailand as T-13
  to Turkey as AB-24
  to Brazil as Piratini (P 10)
  to Brazil as Piraja (P 11)
  to Peru as Rio Chira (PC 12)
  to Iran as Bahram (PGM 212)
  to Thailand as T-14
  to Thailand as T-15
  to Thailand as T-16
  to Thailand as T-17
  to Thailand as T-18
  to Brazil as Pampeio (P 12)
  to Brazil as Parati (P 13)
  to Brazil as Penedo (P 14)
  to Brazil as Poti (P 15)
  to Iran as Nahid (PGM 213)
  to Thailand as T-19
  to Thailand as T-20

Patrol river gunboat (PR)
All built in Shanghai to serve on the Yangtze Patrol.
 , ex-PG-16
 , ex-PG-20
 , ex-Guam (PG-43), captured by Japan 8 December 1941
 , ex-PG-44
 , ex-PG-45, sunk by Japanese aircraft 12 December 1937, 4 killed
 , ex-PG-46, sunk by Japanese gunfire, Corregidor, 5 May 1942
 , ex-PG-47, scuttled 6 May 1942 in Manila Bay
 , ex-PG-48, scuttled 2 May 1942 in Manila Bay

Patrol torpedo boat (PT)

Patrol yacht (PY)

Patrol yacht, coastal (PYc)

Submarine chaser (SC)
These submarine chasers were 110 feet long and used the SC designation. The large missing sections of numbers in designation for the most part come from sharing the same number set as the other bigger 173 foot subchasers that used the PC designation.

SC-1 class (SC-1 to SC-448)

 List of SC-1-class subchasers (SC-1 to SC-50)
 List of SC-1-class subchasers (SC-51 to SC-100)
 List of SC-1-class subchasers (SC-101 to SC-150)
 List of SC-1-class subchasers (SC-151 to SC-200)
 List of SC-1-class subchasers (SC-201 to SC-250)
 List of SC-1-class subchasers (SC-251 to SC-300)
 List of SC-1-class subchasers (SC-301 to SC-350)
 List of SC-1-class subchasers (SC-351 to SC-400)

 
 
 
 
 SC-5 built for France
 
 SC-7 built for France
 
 SC-9 built for France
 SC-10 built for France
 SC-11 built for France
 SC-12 built for France
 SC-13 built for France
 SC-14 built for France
 SC-15 built for France
 SC-16 built for France
 
 
 
 
 
 
 
 
 
 
 
 SC-28 built for France
 SC-29 built for France
 SC-30 built for France
 SC-31 built for France
 SC-32 built for France
 SC-33 built for France
 
 
 
 
 
 
 
 
 
 
 
 
 
 
 
 
 
 
 
 
 
 
 
 
 
 
 
 
 
 
  reclassified 
 SC-65 built for France
 SC-66 built for France
 SC-67 built for France
 
 
 
 
 
 
 
 SC-75 built for France
 SC-76 built for France
 
 
 
 
 
 
 
 
 
 
 
 
 
 
 
 
 
 
 
 
 
 
 
 
 
 
 
 
 
 
 
 
 
 
 
 
 
 
 
 
 
 
 
 
 
 
 
 
 
 
 
 
 
 
 
 
 
 
 
 
 
 
 
 
 
 
 
 
 
 
 
 
 
 
 
 
 
 
 
 
 
 
 
 
 
 
 
 
 
 
 
 
 
 
 
 
 
 
 
 
 
 
 
 
 
 
 
 
 
 
 
 
 
 
 
 
 
 
 
 
 
 
 
 
 
 
 
 
 
 
 
 
 
 
 
 
 
 
 
 
 
 
 
 
 
 
 
 
 
 
 
 
 
 
 
 
 
 
 
 
 
 
 
 
 
 
 
 
 
 
 
 
 
 
 
 
 
 
 
 
 
 
 
 
 
 
 
 
 
 
 
 
 
 
 
 
 
 
 
 
 
 
 
 
 
 
 
 
 
 
 
 
 
 
 
   1920 sold commercial becoming Trawler "Chief Seattle".
  1920 sold commercial becoming Trawler "George L. Harvey" .
 
 
 
 
 
 
 1920 sold commercial becoming Trawler "Joseph Kildall".
 
 
 
 
 
 
 
 
 
 
 
 
 SC-313 built for France
 SC-314 built for France
 SC-315 built for France
 SC-316 built for France
 
 SC-318 built for France
 SC-319 built for France
 
 
 
 
 
 
 
 
 
 
 
 
 
 
 
 
 
 
 
 
 
 
 
 
 
 
 
 SC-347 built for France
 SC-348 built for France
 
 SC-350 built for France
 
 
 
 
 
 
SC-357 to SC-369 built for France
  later to France as FS C-14
SC-371 to SC-387 built for France
  later to France as FS C-28
SC-389 to SC-402 built for France
  later to France as FS C-97
 SC-404 built for France
  later to France as FS C-99
 SC-406 built for France

SC 497 class

Mainly SC-497 to 775, SC-977 to 1076, SC-1267 to 1367, SC-1474 to 1626. Also several were modified to be SCC's a command versions.

 
 
 
 
  ex-PC-501, later Racer (IX-100)
 
 
 
 
 
 
 
509 and 510 used by PC submarine chasers
 
 
 
 
 
 
 
 
 
 
 , foundered 10 July 1945 off Santa Cruz, Solomon Islands
 
523 used by PC submarine chaser
 
 
 
 
 
 
 
 
 
 
 
 
 
 
 
 
 
 
 
 
 
 
 
 
 
 
 
 
 
 
 
 
 
 
 
 
 
 
 
 
 
 
 
 
 
 
 
 
 
 
 
 
 
 
 
 
 
 
 
 
 
 
 
 
 
 
 
 
 
 
 
 
 
 
 
 
 
 
 
 
 
 
 
 
 
 
 
 
 
 
 
 
 
 
 
 
 
 
 
 
 
 
 
 
 
 
 
 
 , foundered in Typhoon Ida, Okinawa, 16 September 1945
 
 
 
 , foundered in Typhoon Louise, Okinawa, 9 October 1945
 
 
 
 
 
 
 
 , later PGM-1
 
 
 
 
 
 
 
 
 
 
 
 
 
 
 
 
 
 
 
 
 
 
 
 
 
 
 
 
 
 
 
 
 
 
 
 
 
 
 
 
 
 
 
 
 
 
 
 
 
 , sunk by aircraft 23 August 1943
 
 , sunk by aircraft 23 August 1943, 18 killed
 
 
 
 
 
 
 
 
 
 
 
 
 
 
 
 
 
 
 
 
 
 
 
 
 
 
 
 
 
 
 
 
 
 
 
 
 
 
 
 
 
 
 
 
 
 
 
 , sunk by Kamikaze 27 November 1944, 1 killed
 
 
 
 
 
 
 
 
 
 
 
 
 , later PGM-2
 
 
 
 
 
 
 
 
 
 
 
 
 
 
 
 
 
 
776-976 used by PC submarine chasers
 
 
 
 
 
 
 
 
 
 
 
 
 
 
 
 
 
 
 
 
 
 
 
 
 
 
 
 
 
 
 
 
 
 
 
 , grounded by Typhoon Louise, Okinawa, 9 October 1945
 
 
 
 
 
 
 
 
 
 
 
 , sunk in collision 2 March 1943
 
 
 
 
 
 
 
 
 
 
 , later PGM-3
 
 
 
 
 
 
 
 
 
 
 
 
 
 
 
 
 
 , later PGM-4
 , later PGM-5
 
 
 
 
 
 
 
 
 
 
 
 
 
 
 
 
 , later PGM-6
 , later PGM-7
 
 
 
 
1077-1265 used by PC submarine chasers
 
 
 
 
 
 
 
 
 
 
 
 
 
 
 
 
 
 
 
 
 
 
 
 
 
 
 
 
 
 
 
 
 
 
 
 
 
 
 
 
 
 
 
 
 
 
 
 
 
 
 
 
 
 
 
 
 
 
 
 
 
 
 
 
 
 
 
 
 
 
 
 
 
 
 
 
 
 
 
 
 
 
 
 
 
 
 
 
 
 
 
 
 
 
 
 
 
 
 
 
 , later PGM-8

SC-1466 to SC-1473

These were British design Fairmile B motor launches built in Canada and loaned to US.

SC-1474 to SC-1626

  / SCC-1474
 
 
 
 
 
 
 
 
 
 
 
 
 
 
 
 
 
 
 
 
 SC-1495 Cancelled 9/17/43
 
 
 
 
 
 SC-1501 Cancelled 9/17/43
 
 
 
 
 
 
 
 SC-1509 Cancelled 9/17/43
 
 
 
 SC-1513 to SC-1516 Cancelled 9/17/43
 
 SC-1518 to SC-1520 Cancelled 8/17/43
 SC-1521 to SC-1545 Cancelled 8/1/43

(incomplete listing)

World War I section patrol (SP) series
Civilian boats and ships were registered during World War I for potential use as section patrol (SP) craft and given "SP" identification numbers in the "ID/SP" numbering series.

Patrol Craft (YP)

See also
 List of current ships of the United States Navy
 List of US Navy ships sunk or damaged in action during World War II § Patrol ships

References

Citations

Sources 
 

Patrol

USN